The Sunshine Trail is a 1923 American silent comedy Western film directed by James W. Horne and written by Bradley King. The film stars Douglas MacLean, Edith Roberts, Muriel Frances Dana, Rex Cherryman, Josie Sedgwick, and Al Hart. The film was released on April 23, 1923, by Associated First National Pictures.

Cast     
 Douglas MacLean as James Henry McTavish
 Edith Roberts as June Carpenter
 Muriel Frances Dana as Algernon Aloysius Fitzmaurice Bangs
 Rex Cherryman as Willis Duckworth
 Josie Sedgwick as Woman Crook 
 Al Hart as Col. Duckworth 
 Barney Furey as Man Crook
 William Courtright as Mystery Man

References

External links
 

1923 films
1920s Western (genre) comedy films
First National Pictures films
Films directed by James W. Horne
American black-and-white films
1923 comedy films
Silent American Western (genre) comedy films
1920s English-language films
1920s American films